Appleton's or Appletons may refer to several publications published by D. Appleton & Company, New York, including:

Appletons' Journal (1869–1881)
Appletons' Cyclopædia of American Biography (1887–1889)
Appleton's Magazine (1905–1909)
Appletons' travel guides

See also
Appleton (surname)